Li Na was the defending champion, but lost in the quarterfinals to Yan Zi.

Yan reached the final, where she was leading 6–4, 4–0 when her opponent Nuria Llagostera Vives retired due to a hamstring injury, giving Yan the title.

Seeds

Draw

Finals

Top half

Bottom half

External links 
 ITF tournament edition details

Guangzhou International Women's Open
2005 WTA Tour